The following is an overview of 2015 in manga. It includes winners of notable awards, best-sellers, title debuts and endings, deaths of notable manga-related people as well as any other relevant manga-related events. For an overview of the year in comics from other countries, see 2015 in comics.

Awards
39th Kodansha Manga Awards
Best Shōnen Manga: The Seven Deadly Sins by Nakaba Suzuki and Yowamushi Pedal by Wataru Watanabe
Best Shōjo Manga: Nigeru wa Haji da ga Yaku ni Tatsu by Tsunami Umino	
Best General Manga: Knights of Sidonia by Tsutomu Nihei
Special Award: Cooking Papa by Tochi Ueyama
8th Manga Taishō: Kakukaku Shikajika by Akiko Higashimura
46th Seiun Awards
Best Comic: Moyasimon: Tales of Agriculture by Masayuki Ishikawa
60th Shogakukan Manga Awards
Best Children's Manga: Yōkai Watch by Noriyuki Konishi
Best Shōnen Manga: Be Blues! - Ao ni Nare by 
Best Shōjo Manga: Joō no Hana by Kaneyoshi Izumi
Best General Manga: Asahinagu by Ai Kozaki and Aoi Honō by Kazuhiko Shimamoto
19th Tezuka Osamu Cultural Prize
Grand Prize: Aisawa Riku by Yoiko Hoshi
New Creator Prize: A Silent Voice by Yoshitoki Ōima
Short Work Prize: Sensha Yoshida
Special Prize: Chikako Mitsuhashi for Chiisana Koi no Monogatari

Best-sellers

Titles
The following is a list of the 10 best-selling manga titles in Japan during 2015 according to Oricon.

Volumes
The following is a list of the 10 best-selling manga volumes in Japan during 2015 according to Oricon.

Title debuts
January - Anti-Magic Academy: The 35th Test Platoon by Yohei Yasumura
January  - Q.E.D. iff - proven end - by Motohiro Katou
January 27 - Zettai Zetsubō Shōjo: Danganronpa AE Genocider Mode, written by Spike Chunsoft and illustrated by Machika Minami
January 30 - Manabi Straight! Sakra, written by Ufotable and illustrated by Eshika/Shōgo
February - Fushigi Yûgi Byakko Ibun by Yuu Watase
February - Heavy Object A, written by Kazuma Kamachi and illustrated by Sakae Saitō
February 12 - Aldnoah.Zero 2nd Season , written by Olympus Knights and illustrated by Mahi Fuyube
February 15 - Boys Over Flowers Season 2 by Yoko Kamio
February 16 - The Case of Hana & Alice by Dowman Sayman
February 20 - Danganronpa Another Episode: Ultra Despair Girls, written by Spike Chunsoft, illustrated by Hajime Tōya
March - Go! Princess PreCure, written by Izumi Todo and illustrated by Futago Kamikita
March - Love in Hell: Death Life by Reiji Suzumaru
March - Maō Da Ze! Oreca Battle by Satoshi Yamaura
March 3 - Shokugeki no Soma - L'étoile, written by Michiko Itō and illustrated by Shun Saeki
March 7 - Piece of Cake: Bangai-hen Piece 1 by George Asakura
March 31 - Mahou Shoujo Nante Mouiidesukara by Sui Futami
April - Komasan: A Time for Fireworks and Miracles by Shou Shibamoto
April - Serapetit!〜Seraph of the End four-frame manga〜, written by Takaya Kagami, Yamato Yamamoto and Daisuke Furuya and illustrated by Ren Aokita
April - Yo-kai Watch: 4-Koma Pun-Club by Santa Harukaze
April 3 - Yu-Gi-Oh! Arc-V: Saikyō Duelist Yuya by Akihiro Tomonaga
April 18 - K: Missing Kings, written by Hideyuki Furuhashi and illustrated by Haruto Shiota
April 22 - Fushigi na Somera-chan Haute Couture by Choborau Nyopomi
April 22 - Grimgar of Fantasy and Ash by Mutsumi Okubashi
April 27 - Girls und Panzer: Little Army II by Tsuchii
April 27 - Naruto: The Seventh Hokage and the Scarlet Spring by Masashi Kishimoto
May 12 - Trash Market by Tadao Tsuge
May 22 - Star-Myu by Ren Hidoh
May 27 - Re:Zero kara Hajimeru Isekai Seikatsu: Daisanshō - Truth of Zero, written by Tappei Nagatsuki and illustrated by Daichi Matsuse
May 28 - Marriage ~The Drops of God Final Arc~, written by Tadashi Agi and illustrated by Shu Okimoto
June - Plastic Memories: Say to Good-bye, written by Naotaka Hayashi and illustrated by Yūyū
June - Yo-Kai Watch Busters by Atsushi Ohba
June 20 - Dragon Ball Super, written by Akira Toriyama and illustrated by Toyotarou
June 26 - Hybrid x Heart Magias Academy Ataraxia by Riku Ayakawa
June 27 - Classroom Crisis by Masaharu Takano
July 13 - Queen's Quality by Kyousuke Motomi
August - Beyblade: Burst
August - Monster Musume: I ♥ Monster Girls by Shake-O, SaQ Tottori and Cool-Kyou-Sinnjya
August 9 - Lost Girls by Ryōsuke Fuji
August 19 - Little Witch Academia, written by Trigger and illustrated by Terio Teri
August 21 - Yu-Gi-Oh! Arc-V by Naohito Miyoshi
September - Charlotte, written by Jun Maeda and illustrated by Makoto Ikezawa and Yū Tsurusaki
September - Concrete Revolutio by Nylon
September 3 - Little Witch Academia: Tsukiyo no Ōkan by Yuka Fujiwara
September 4 - Fruits Basket another by Natsuki Takaya
September 18 - Dance with Devils -Blight- by Samako Natsu
September 28 - K: Dream of Green, written by GoRA and illustrated by Yui Kuroe
October - Cyborg 009 Vs. Devilman: Breakdown by Akihito Yoshitomi
October - Mobile Suit Gundam: Iron-Blooded Orphans by Kazuma Isobe
October 2 - Koro-sensei Q! by Kizuku Watanabe and Jō Aoto
October 16 - Baccano by Shinta Fujimoto
October 17 - K: Return of Kings, written by Hideyuki Furuhashi and illustrated by Haruto Shiota
October 26 - Aokana: Four Rhythm Across the Blue, written by Sprite and illustrated by Hideyu Tōgarashi
October 27 - Hai-Furi by Kanari Abe
October 27 - My Girlfriend is a T-Rex by Sanzo
November 4 - Platinum End, written by Tsugumi Ohba and illustrated by Takeshi Obata
November 4 - Terra Formars Asimov by Boichi
November 9 - My Hero Academia Smash!! by Hirofumi Neda and Kōhei Horikoshi
November 17 - GANTZ:G, written by Hiroya Oku and illustrated by Keita Iizuka
November 27 - Prince of Stride: Galaxy Rush by Teruko Arai
November 28 - The Seven Deadly Sins Production by Chiemi Sakamoto
December - Haruchika, written by Sei Hatsuno and illustrated by Būta
December 1 - Hozuki no Reitetsu ~Shiro no Ashiato~ by Monaka Shiba
Ace of Diamond Act II 
Kare Baka: Wagahai no Kare wa Baka de R, written by Kazusa Yoneda and illustrated by Saki Azumi
Major 2nd by Takuya Mitsuda
Senyuu. Main Quest - Dai Nishou by Robinson Haruhara
The Unlimit d: Hyōbu Kyōsuke - WANDERER by Rokurou Ogaki

Title endings
February - HappinessCharge PreCure!, written by Izumi Todo and illustrated by Futago Kamikita
February - Monster Retsuden Oreca Battle by Satoshi Yamaura
March 29 - Cross Ange: Tenshi to Ryū no Ecole by Osaji
April - Jinsei, written by Jinsei: Manga no Shō and illustrated by Seiji Matsuyama
June 4 - Complex Age by Yui Sakuma
June 17 - Himegoto  by Norio Tsukudani
June 25 - Cute High Earth Defense Club Love! by Umatani Kurari
June 27 - Himegoto 
July 6 - Naruto: The Seventh Hokage and the Scarlet Spring by Masashi Kishimoto
July 17 - Fairy Tail Zero by Hiro Mashima
August 18 - K: Missing Kings, written by Hideyuki Furuhashi and illustrated by Haruto Shiota
August 19 - Girls und Panzer: Gekitou! Maginot-sen Desu!! by Ryūichi Saitaniya
August - Chain Chronicle Crimson by Junpei Okazaki
September - Komasan: A Time for Fireworks and Miracles by Shou Shibamoto
October - Yo-Kai Watch Busters by Atsushi Ohba
November 20 - Little Witch Academia, written by Trigger and illustrated by Terio Teri
December 1 - Fairy Tail: Blue Mistral by Rui Watanabe
Senyuu. Main Quest - Dai Nishou by Robinson Haruhara

Deaths
Kazumasa Hirai, writer, manga writer
March - Yoshihiro Tatsumi, manga artist
March 31 - Cocoa Fujiwara, manga artist
April - Kō Kojima, manga artist
June 17 - , manga artist
August 18 - , manga writer
October 22 - , manga artist
November 21 - , manga writer
November - Shigeru Mizuki, manga artist

See also
2015 in anime
2015 in Japanese literature

References

2015 in comics
2015 in Japan